Puerto Rico is a town and municipality in Caquetá Department, Colombia.

Climate
Puerto Rico has a very wet tropical rainforest climate (Af).

References

Municipalities of Caquetá Department